The Johnson County War, also known as the War on Powder River and the Wyoming Range War, was a range conflict that took place in Johnson County, Wyoming from 1889 to 1893. The conflict began when cattle companies started ruthlessly persecuting alleged rustlers in the area, many of whom were settlers who competed with them for livestock, land and water rights. As violence swelled between the large established ranchers and the smaller settlers in the state, it culminated in the Powder River Country when the former hired gunmen to invade the county. The gunmen's initial incursion in the territory alerted the small farmers and ranchers, as well as the state lawmen, and they formed a posse of 200 men that led to a grueling stand-off. The siege ended when the United States Cavalry on the orders of President Benjamin Harrison relieved the two forces, although further fighting persisted in the following months.

The events have since become a highly mythologized and symbolic story of the Wild West and over the years variations of the story have come to include some of its most famous historical figures. In addition to being one of the best-known range wars of the American frontier, its themes, especially class warfare, served as a basis for numerous popular novels, films and television shows in the Western genre.

Background
Conflict over land was a common occurrence in the development of the American West, but was particularly prevalent during the late 19th century, when large portions of the West were being settled by new immigrants
for the first time through the Homestead Acts. It is a period that one historian, Richard Maxwell Brown, has called the "Western Civil War of Incorporation", of which the Johnson County War was a part.

In the early days of Wyoming most of the land was in public domain, which was open to stock raising as an open range and farmlands for homesteading. Large numbers of cattle were turned loose on the open range by large ranches. Each spring, round-ups were held to separate the cattle belonging to different ranches. Before a round-up, an orphan or stray calf was sometimes surreptitiously branded, which was the common way to identify the cow's owners. Lands and water rights were usually distributed to whoever settled the property first, and farmers and ranchers had to respect these boundaries (the doctrine was known as Prior Appropriation). However, as more and more homesteaders called "grangers" moved into Wyoming, competition for land and water soon enveloped the state, and the cattle companies reacted by monopolizing large areas of the open range to prevent homesteaders from using it. 

The often uneasy relationship between the larger, wealthier ranches and smaller ranch settlers became steadily worse after the harsh winter of 1886–1887, when a series of blizzards and temperatures of –50 to –40 °F (–45 to –40 °C) followed by an extremely hot and dry summer, ravaged the frontier. Thousands of cattle were lost in the calamity. To protect what remained, the cattle companies reacted with a catch-all allegation of rustling against their competition. Hostilities worsened when the Wyoming legislature passed the Maverick Act, which stated that all unbranded cattle in the open range automatically belonged to the cattlemen's association. The cattlemen also held a firm grip on Wyoming's stock interests by limiting the number of small ranchers that could participate, including the annual round-ups. They also forbade their employees from owning cattle for fear of additional competition, and threatened anyone they suspected to be rustlers.

Wyoming Stock Growers Association
Many of the large ranching outfits in Wyoming were organized as the Wyoming Stock Growers Association (the WSGA) and gathered socially at the Cheyenne Club in Cheyenne, Wyoming. Comprising some of the state's wealthiest and most influential residents, the organization held a great deal of political sway in the state and region. The WSGA organized the cattle industry by scheduling roundups and cattle shipments. The WSGA also employed an agency of detectives to investigate cases of cattle theft from its members' holdings. Grangers and rustlers often intermixed with one another in the community, making it more difficult for the detectives to differentiate the criminals and the innocent homesteaders.

Rustling in the local area was likely increasing due to the harsh grazing conditions, and the illegal exploits of organized groups of rustlers were becoming well publicized in the late 1880s. Well-armed outfits of horse and cattle rustlers roamed across various portions of Wyoming and Montana, with Montana vigilantes such as the infamous Stuart's Stranglers declaring "War on the Rustlers" in 1884. Bandits taking refuge in the infamous hideout known as the  Hole-in-the-Wall were also preying upon the herds. Frank M. Canton, Sheriff of Johnson County in the early 1880s and better known as a detective for the WSGA, was a prominent figure in eliminating these supposed criminals from Wyoming. Before the events in Johnson County, Canton had already developed a reputation as a lethal gunman. At a young age he had worked as a cowboy in Texas, and in 1871 started a career in robbery and cattle rustling, as well as killing a Buffalo Soldier on October 10, 1874. Historian Harry Sinclair Drago described Canton as a "merciless, congenital, emotionless killer. For pay, he murdered eight—very likely ten—men."

War

Early killings

On July 20, 1889, a range detective from the Association named George Henderson accused Ella Watson, a local rancher, of stealing cattle from a fellow rancher by the name of Albert John Bothwell. The cattlemen sent riders to seize Ella before capturing her husband Jim Averell as well. Both of them were subsequently hanged from a tree. This gruesome act was one of the rare cases in the Old West in which a woman was lynched, an event that appalled many of the local residents and paved the way for future events in the war. County Sheriff Frank Hadsell arrested six men for the lynching and a trial date was set. However, before the trial, threats were sent to the witnesses who would testify against the aggressors. One of those witnesses was young Gene Crowder, who mysteriously disappeared under unknown circumstances before the trial. Another, Jim's nephew and foreman Frank Buchanan, disappeared from the county as well after a shoot-out with unknown suspects, and was presumed to be hiding or murdered. Ralph Cole, another nephew of Averell's, died on the day of the trial from poisoning.

Enemies of the Association soon fought back. George Henderson, the range detective who had accused Ella Watson, was murdered near Sweetwater Creek in October 1890. The cattle barons soon tightened their control and hunted down those who tried to oppose them. The double lynching of the Averells was followed by the lynching of Tom Waggoner, a horse trader from Newcastle, in June 1891. A friend of Waggoner named Jimmy the Butcher, who was once arrested for rustling from the Standard Cattle Company, was also murdered. Range detective Tom Smith killed a suspected rustler, and when he was indicted for murder, political connections of the Association secured his release. These killings would precipitate more hostilities and violence in the years to come.

After the lynchings of their prominent competitors, the WSGA's control over the range was undisputed, until a group of smaller ranchers formed the Northern Wyoming Farmers and Stock Growers' Association (NWFSGA) to compete with the WSGA, led by a local cowboy named Nate Champion. Upon hearing this, the WSGA immediately viewed the new association as a threat to their hold on the stock interests. The WSGA then blacklisted members of the NWFSGA from the round-ups in order to stop their operations. However, the latter refused the orders to disband and instead publicly announced their plans to hold their own round-up in the spring of 1892.

Soon, the prominent cattlemen sent out an assassination squad to kill Nate Champion on the morning of November 1, 1891. Champion and another man named Ross Gilbertson were sleeping in a cabin in Middle Fork of Powder River when a group of armed men went inside. Two of them went in while another stood by outside. Champion was immediately awakened by the intrusion, and as the gunmen pointed their weapons at him, Champion reached for his own pistol hidden under a pillow and a shootout commenced. Champion successfully shot two of the gunmen, mortally wounding and killing asassin Billy Lykins. The rest of the assassination squad subsequently fled. Champion was left uninjured except for some facial powder burns from the gunfight. In a subsequent investigation of the attack, the names of those involved were leaked to two ranchers: John A. Tisdale and Orley "Ranger" Jones. However, both men were ambushed while they were riding, which outraged many of the small ranchers and farmers in the county.

Invaders

The WSGA, led by Frank Wolcott (WSGA Member and large North Platte rancher), hired gunmen with the intention of eliminating alleged rustlers in Johnson County and breaking up the NWFSGA. By that time, prominent names in Wyoming started taking sides. Acting Governor Amos W. Barber supported the cattlemen, who blamed the small ranchers and homesteaders for the criminal activity in the state. Former cowboy, Indian War veteran, and sheriff of Buffalo (the county seat of Johnson County), William "Red" Angus, supported the homesteaders, who believed that the cattle barons were abusing the homesteaders.

In March 1892, the cattlemen sent agents to Texas from Cheyenne and Idaho to recruit gunmen and finally carry out their plans for exterminating the homesteaders. The cattle barons had always used hired guns from Texas to take out suspected rustlers and scare away the nesters in Wyoming. One particular act of violence perpetrated by the Texans was recounted by cowboy John J. Baker, where the Texans ambushed and killed nine trappers whom they mistook for rustlers in Big Dry Creek, Wyoming. They received a $450 bonus for the slaughter.

Soon, 23 gunmen from Paris, Texas and 4 cattle detectives from the WSGA were hired, as well as Wyoming dignitaries who also joined the expedition. State Senator Bob Tisdale, state water commissioner W. J. Clarke, as well as William C. Irvine and Hubert Teshemacher, who had both been instrumental in organizing Wyoming's statehood four years earlier, also joined the band. They were accompanied by surgeon Charles Bingham Penrose as well as Ed Towse, a reporter for the Cheyenne Sun, and a newspaper reporter for the Chicago Herald, Sam T. Clover, whose lurid first-hand accounts later appeared in eastern newspapers.  A total expedition of 50 men was organized which consisted of cattlemen and range detectives, as well as the 23 hired guns from Texas. To lead the expedition, the WSGA hired Frank M. Canton. Canton's gripsack was later found to contain a list of 70 county residents to be either shot or hanged, and a contract to pay the Texans $5 a day plus a bonus of $50 for every rustler, real or alleged, they killed. The group became known as "The Invaders", or alternately, "Wolcott's Regulators".

John Clay, a prominent Wyoming businessman, was suspected of playing a major role in planning the Johnson County invasion.  Clay denied this, saying that in 1891 he advised Wolcott against the scheme and was out of the country when it was undertaken. He later helped the "Invaders" avoid punishment after their surrender. The group organized in Cheyenne and proceeded by train to Casper, Wyoming and then toward Johnson County on horseback, cutting the telegraph lines north of Douglas, Wyoming in order to prevent an alarm. While on horseback, Canton and the gunmen traveled ahead while the party of WSGA officials led by Wolcott followed a safe distance behind.

Shootout at the KC Ranch
The first target of the WSGA was Nate Champion, who was at the KC Ranch (also known as Kaycee) at that time. They were tasked to perform the assassination that others had failed to carry out five months before. The group traveled to the ranch late Friday, April 8, 1892, quietly surrounded the buildings, and waited for daybreak. Three men besides Champion were at the KC. Two men who were evidently going to spend the night on their way through were captured as they emerged from the cabin early that morning to collect water at the nearby Powder River, while the third, Nick Ray, was shot while standing inside the doorway of the cabin. As the gunmen opened fire on the cabin, Champion dragged the mortally wounded Nick Ray back to the cabin. The latter died hours later, and Champion was left besieged inside the log cabin alone.

Champion held out for several hours, wounding three of the vigilantes, and was said to have killed four others. Another settler by the name of Jack Flagg passed by Champion's ranch on his wagon together with his stepson and witnessed the siege. The Invaders recognized Jack Flagg as one of the men on the list and they started shooting at him. Flagg then rode away and, as the Invaders gave chase, he grabbed his rifle and beat them back. During the siege, Champion kept a poignant journal which contained a number of notes he wrote to friends while taking cover inside the cabin. "Boys, I feel pretty lonesome just now. I wish there was someone here with me so we could watch all sides at once," he wrote. The last journal entry read: "Well, they have just got through shelling the house like hail. I heard them splitting wood. I guess they are going to fire the house tonight. I think I will make a break when night comes, if alive. Shooting again. It's not night yet. The house is all fired. Goodbye, boys, if I never see you again."

The Invaders continued to shoot at the cabin while others set it on fire using a wagon they managed to steal from Flagg. Nate Champion signed his journal entry and put it in his pocket before running from the back door with a six-shooter in one hand and either a knife or a rifle in the other. As he emerged, the Invaders shot him dead. The killers pinned a note on Champion's bullet-riddled chest that read, "Cattle Thieves Beware". Jack Flagg, after escaping his pursuers, rode to Buffalo where he reported Champion's dilemma to the townsfolk. Sheriff Angus then raised a posse of 200 men (many of whom were Civil War veterans) over the next 24 hours and set out for the KC on Sunday night, April 10.

Siege of the TA Ranch

The WSGA group then headed north on Sunday toward Buffalo to continue its show of force. By early morning of the 11th however, news quickly came of a large hostile force heading towards them. They quickly rode and took refuge in the TA Ranch in Crazy Woman Creek. During their flight, one of the Texans by the name of Jim Dudley accidentally shot himself when his horse bucked and his rifle fell to the ground, discharging and hitting his knee. He was later escorted by two others to Fort McKinney to seek treatment, but died in the fort one or two days later from gangrene.

The sheriff's posse finally reached the remaining Invaders holed up in a log barn at the TA Ranch, but the latter managed to hold them back, resulting in a siege that would last for three days. The posse surrounded the whole ranch, building pits on the ground for cover and killing the Invaders' horses to prevent them from escaping. The New York Times reported that twenty men tried to escape behind a fusillade, but the posse beat them back and killed three to five. Another Texas gunman named Alex Lowther accidentally shot himself mortally in the groin during the fight. As the siege dragged on, a settler rode off to Fort McKinney requesting to borrow a cannon but was turned down. A blacksmith named Rap Brown tried to build his own cannon, but it exploded when he first tested it. He then built a siege engine he called the "Ark of Safety"—a large, bullet-resistant wagon that would help the settlers get close to the ranch so they could throw dynamite at the Invaders.

Fortunately for the Invaders, one of their members, Mike Shonsey, managed to slip from the barn and was able to contact Governor Barber the next day. Frantic efforts to save the WSGA group ensued, and two days into the siege, late on the night of April 12, 1892, Governor Barber telegraphed President Benjamin Harrison a plea for help.

The telegram read:

Harrison immediately ordered the U.S. Secretary of War Stephen B. Elkins to address the situation under Article IV, Section 4, Clause 2 of the U.S. Constitution, which allows for the use of U.S. forces under the President's orders for "protection from invasion and domestic violence". The Sixth Cavalry from Fort McKinney near Buffalo was ordered to proceed to the TA ranch at once and take the WSGA expedition into custody. The 6th Cavalry left Fort McKinney a few hours later at 2 am on April 13 and reached the TA ranch at 6:45 a.m. as the settlers were about to use the Ark of Safety. Colonel J.J. Van Horn, the officer in charge of the unit, negotiated with Sheriff Angus to lift the siege, and in return the Invaders were to be handed to civilian authorities. The Sixth Cavalry took possession of Wolcott and 45 other men with 45 rifles, 41 revolvers and some 5,000 rounds of ammunition, before escorting them first to Fort McKinney and then to Cheyenne.

The text of Barber's telegram to the President was printed on the front page of The New York Times on April 14, and a first-hand account of the siege at the T.A. appeared in The Times and the Chicago Herald and other papers.

Arrest and legal action
The WSGA group was taken to Cheyenne to be held at the barracks of Fort D.A. Russell since the Laramie County Jail was unable to hold that many prisoners. They received preferential treatment and were allowed to roam the base by day as long as they agreed to return to the jail to sleep at night. Johnson County officials were upset that the group was not kept locally at Ft. McKinney. The general in charge of the 6th Cavalry felt that tensions were too high for the prisoners to remain in the area. Hundreds of armed locals sympathetic to both sides of the conflict were said to have gone to Ft. McKinney over the next few days under the mistaken impression the Invaders were being held there.

The Johnson County attorney began to gather evidence for the case and the details of the WSGA's plan emerged. Canton's gripsack was found to contain a list of seventy alleged rustlers who were to be shot or hanged, a list of ranch houses the Invaders had burned, and a contract to pay each Texan five dollars a day plus a bonus of $50 for each person killed. The Invader’s plans reportedly included eventually murdering people as far away as Casper and Douglas. The Times reported on April 23 that "the evidence is said to implicate more than twenty prominent stockmen of Cheyenne whose names have not been mentioned heretofore, also several wealthy stockmen of Omaha, as well as to compromise men high in authority in the State of Wyoming. They will all be charged with aiding and abetting the invasion, and warrants will be issued for the arrest of all of them."

The Invaders, however, were protected by a friendly judicial system, and they took advantage of the cattle barons' corruption. Charges against the men "high in authority" in Wyoming were never filed. Eventually they were released on bail and were told to return to Wyoming for the trial. Many fled to Texas and were never seen again. In the end, the WSGA group went free after the charges were dropped on the excuse that Johnson County refused to pay for the costs of the long prosecution. The costs of housing the men at Fort D.A. Russell were said to exceed $18,000 and the sparsely populated Johnson County was unable to pay for them

Final killings
Tensions in Johnson County remained high. On May 10, U.S. Marshall George Wellman, was ambushed and killed by locals en route to the small community of Buffalo. The incident received national attention, with Wellman being the only marshal to die in the war. Wellman was one of the hired guns who joined the Invaders, and his death was grieved by a large crowd. The 6th Cavalry, sent to relieve the county of its violence, was said to be influenced by intense local political and social pressure, and they were unable to keep the peace. One infamous event occurred when a group of men set fire to the post exchange and planted a homemade bomb in the cavalry's barracks. Noted officer Charles B. Gatewood was seriously injured by the bomb blast in the barracks, shattering his left arm and ending his cavalry career.

The 9th Cavalry of "Buffalo Soldiers" was ordered to Fort McKinney to replace the 6th. In a fortnight the Buffalo Soldiers moved from Nebraska to the rail town of Suggs, Wyoming, where they created "Camp Bettens" to quell the local population. Reception from the settlers were negative and in one violent incident, a gunfight erupted between them and some Buffalo soldiers who entered the town. After being initially driven off, 20 more soldiers slipped from the camp to exact revenge, but the locals fought back, resulting in the death of one Buffalo Soldier named Pvt. Willis Johnson, and the wounding of two other soldiers. Another two detachments were sent and this time the locals allowed the soldiers to investigate but no one was convicted. The event forced the Army to retire the regiment from the place on November, 1892.<ref name="Fields">Linse, Tamara. Range and Race. Star Tribune. February 24, 2005</ref>Rea, Tom, Buffalo Soldiers in Wyoming and the West, Wyoming History. January 30, 2015

In the fall of 1892, as the aftershock of the stand-off was still being felt throughout the county, two alleged horse rustlers were gunned down by range detectives east of the Big Horn River. The killers escaped the law with assistance from Otto Franc, a rancher who had sided with the large cattle company faction. On May 24, 1893, Nate Champion's brother, Dudley Champion, came to Wyoming looking for work and was shot and killed in cold blood. Fifteen miles from town, Dudley had come across the ranch of Mike Shonsey who, after seeing him, immediately grabbed a gun and fired at him. A coroner's inquiry ruled Shonsey's actions were self-defense and he was acquitted of murder. Afterwards, Shonsey left the country before the officials could continue with the investigation. A year before Nate Champion's death, Shonsey actually met him near the Beaver Creek Canyon, where a fight almost commenced between the two as Nate suspected that Shonsey was one of the five men who had attacked him in his cabin. He further threatened Shonsey and demanded he give up the names of the rest of the assassins. This event made Shonsey harbor hatred toward Nate and probably toward his brother Dudley as well. Dudley Champion was the last person killed in association with the Johnson County War.

Aftermath

Emotions ran high for many years afterward. Some considered the large and wealthy ranchers as heroes who had sought what they regarded as  justice by using violence to defend what they regarded as their rights to rangeland and water rights, while others saw the WSGA as heavy-handed outlaw vigilantes running roughshod over the law. A number of tall tales were spun by both sides afterwards to make their actions appear morally justified. Parties sympathetic to the invaders painted Ella Watson as a prostitute and cattle rustler, Jim Averell as her murderous partner in crime and pimp and Nate Champion as the leader of a vast cattle rustling empire, claiming that he was a leading member of the fabled "Red Sash Gang" of outlaws that supposedly included the likes of the Jesse James gang.Davis (2010) p. 128 These claims have since been discredited. While men frequently visited Watson's cabin, this was because she mended clothing for cowboys to earn extra money. While some accounts do note that Champion wore a red sash at the time of his death, such sashes were common. While the Hole in the Wall Gang was known to hide out in Johnson County, there is no evidence that Champion had any relationship to them. Parties sympathetic to the smaller ranchers spun tales that included some of the West's most notorious gunslingers under the employ of the Invaders, including such legends as Tom Horn and Big Nose George Parrot. Horn did briefly work as a detective for the WSGA in the 1890s but there is little evidence he was involved in the war.

Political effects
Although many of the leaders of the WSGA's hired force, such as William C. Irvine, were Democrats, the ranchers who had hired the group were tied to the Republican party and their opponents were mostly Democrats. Many viewed the rescue of the WSGA group at the order of President Harrison (a Republican) and the failure of the courts to prosecute them a serious political scandal with overtones of class war. As a result of the scandal, the Democratic Party became popular in Wyoming for a time, winning the governorship in 1892 and taking control of both houses of the state legislature in that election. Wyoming voted for the Democrat William Jennings Bryan in the 1896 U.S. Presidential Election, and Johnson County was one of the two counties in the state with the largest Bryan majorities.

Economic analysis
Historian Daniel Belgrad argues that in the 1880s centralized range management was emerging as the solution to the overgrazing that had depleted open ranges. Moreover, cattle prices at the time were low. Larger ranchers also were hurt by mavericking (taking lost, unbranded calves from other ranchers' herds), and responded by organizing cooperative roundups, blacklisting, and lobbying for stricter anti-maverick laws. These ranchers formed the WSGA and hired gunmen to hunt down rustlers, but local farmers resented the ranchers' collective political power. The farmers moved toward decentralization and the use of private winter pastures. Randy McFerrin and Douglas Wills argue that the confrontation represented opposing property rights systems. The result was the end of the open-range system and the dominance of large-scale stock ranching and farming. The popular image of the war, however, remains that of vigilantism by aggressive landed interests against small individual settlers defending their rights.

By 1893, the WSGA was opened to the other small ranchers and farmers, finally ending their monopoly and control over Wyoming business interests. Previous practices of the WSGA, such as vigilantism and confiscation of cattle, were finally stopped. Many prominent leaders of the Association such as Frank Wolcott, Frank M. Canton and Tom Smith later left the area.

Legacy

The Johnson County War, with its overtones of class warfare coupled with the intervention ordered by the President of the United States to save the lives of a gang of hired killers and set them free, is not a flattering reflection on the American myth of the west. The Johnson County War has been one of the best-known range wars of the frontier. It has been a popular feature of the Western genre of fiction, which includes literature, films and television shows. The Banditti of the Plains, written in 1894 by witness Asa Mercer, is the earliest record of the Johnson County War. The book was suppressed for many years by the WSGA, who seized and destroyed all but a few of the first edition copies from the 1894 printing; they were rumored to have hijacked and destroyed the second printing as it was being shipped from a printer north of Denver, Colorado. The book was reprinted several times in the 20th century and most recently in 2015. Frances McElrath's 1902 novel The Rustler, took inspiration from the Johnson County War, and was sympathetic to the perspective of the small ranchers.The Virginian, a seminal 1902 western novel by Owen Wister, took the side of the wealthy ranchers, creating a myth of the Johnson County War, but bore little resemblance to a factual account of the actual characters and events. Jack Schaefer's popular 1949 novel Shane treated themes associated with the Johnson County War and took the side of the settlers. The 1953 film The Redhead from Wyoming, starring Maureen O'Hara, dealt with similar themes; in one scene Maureen O'Hara's character is told, "It won't be long before they're calling you Cattle Kate." In the 1968 novel True Grit by Charles Portis, the main character, Rooster Cogburn, was involved in the Johnson County War. In the early 1890s Rooster had gone north to Wyoming where he was "hired by stock owners to terrorize thieves and people called nesters and grangers... . I fear that Rooster did himself no credit in what they called the Johnson County War."

Films such as Heaven's Gate (1980) and The Johnson County War (TV-movie, 2002) painted the wealthy ranchers as the "bad guys". Heaven's Gate was a dramatic romance loosely based on historical events, while The Johnson County War was based on the 1957 novel Riders of Judgment by Frederick Manfred. The range war was also portrayed in an episode of Jim Davis's syndicated western television series Stories of the Century, with Henry Brandon as Nate Champion and Jean Parker as Ella Watson.Jim Davis' Stories of the Century, Vintage Magazine (May 5, 1964). Issue #9 American Heroes Channel presented the Johnson County War in the sixth episode of their Blood Feuds series documentary.

The story of the Johnson County War from the point of view of the small ranchers was chronicled by Kaycee resident Chris LeDoux in his song "Johnson County War" on the 1989 album Powder River. The song included references to the burning of the KC Ranch, the capture of the WSGA men, the intervention of the U.S. Cavalry and the release of the cattlemen and hired guns. The Jim Gatchell Memorial Museum in Buffalo featured dioramas and exhibits about the Johnson County War, as well as a  bronze statue of Nate Champion. Kaycee, Wyoming, the old site of the KC Ranch, also erected the Hoofprints in the Past'' Museum to commemorate the war.

See also
 List of feuds in the United States

References

Citations

Further reading

External links
 The Johnson County War: 1892 Invasion of Northern Wyoming
 Photographs and a brief account of Johnson County War

Conflicts in 1892
1892 in the United States
Wyoming Territory
Johnson County, Wyoming
Range wars and feuds of the American Old West
Internal wars of the United States
Feuds in the United States
American cattlemen